Sallenelles is a commune in the Calvados department in the Normandy region in northwestern France.

Population

Tourism
Most visitors to Sallenelles come to see the Orne estuary, to walk, cycle, or hunt the local water-fowl, or the Maison de la Nature, a permanent exhibition on the local ecosystem. World War II veterans come to see the memorial to the Belgian Brigade Piron which liberated the village in 1944.

Transportation
Sallenelles is on the D514 between Ranville and Merville-Franceville-Plage. There is also a road to Amfreville. The Bus Verts line 20 has some services that stop at Sallenelles.

See also
Communes of the Calvados department

References

Communes of Calvados (department)
Calvados communes articles needing translation from French Wikipedia